São Paulo, Sociedade Anônima is a 1965 Brazilian drama film written and directed by Luis Sérgio Person. The film was selected as the Brazilian entry for the Best Foreign Language Film at the 38th Academy Awards, but was not accepted as a nominee.

Plot
In the film Carlos, a middle-class man from São Paulo during the development of the automotive industry in the late 1950s, has an existential crisis amidst the industrialization process.

Cast
 Walmor Chagas as Carlos
 Darlene Glória as Ana
 Ana Esmeralda as Hilda
 Eva Wilma as Luciana

See also
 List of submissions to the 38th Academy Awards for Best Foreign Language Film
 List of Brazilian submissions for the Academy Award for Best Foreign Language Film

References

External links
 

1965 drama films
1965 films
1960s Portuguese-language films
Brazilian drama films
Brazilian black-and-white films
Films directed by Luis Sérgio Person
Films set in São Paulo